Peru national under-20 football team represents Peru in international football competitions such as South American Youth Championship.

Peruvian U-20 squad has participated in all South American Youth Championships, but had no luck in qualifying to a World Cup. Their best appearance was in 1967, finishing in 3rd place.

Teams managed by Juan Carlos Oblitas in 1999, by Daniel Ahmed in 2013, and by Víctor Rivera in 2015 have been the most successful teams until 2015. The three of them reached the 5th place. In other appearances, Peru was almost always eliminated in Group Stage.

Competition records

FIFA U-20 World Cup

Current squad
 The following players were called up for the Football at the 2022 South American Games.
 Match dates: 1–14 October 2022
 Opposition: ,  and Caps and goals correct as of:' 28 September 2022, after the match against 

Previous managers

 César (Chalaca) Gonzales
 Dragan Miranović
 Juan Carlos Oblitas
 Julio César Uribe
 Julio García
 José Luis Pavoni
 Rafael Castillo
 Roberto (Tito) Drago
 Hector (Tito'') Chumpitaz Dulanto
 Gustavo Ferrín

Famous previous players

 Wilmer Aguirre
 Piero Alva
 Sandro Baylón
 Marko Ciurlizza
 Erick Delgado
 Jefferson Farfán
 Jean Ferrari
 George Forsyth
 Luis Guadalupe
 Martín Hidalgo
 Damián Ísmodes
 Abel Lobatón
 Flavio Maestri
 Paolo Maldonado
 Manuel Marengo
 Andrés Mendoza
 Claudio Pizarro
 Ámilton Prado
 Alberto Rodríguez
 Junior Ross
 Guillermo Salas
 Nolberto Solano
 Juan Vargas
 Walter Vílchez
 Junior Viza
 Carlos Zambrano
 Reimond Manco

References

External links
Peru U20 news at ovacion.pe

under-20
South American national under-20 association football teams